Palais Schaumburg is a neoclassical-style building in Bonn, Germany, which served as the primary official seat of the German Federal Chancellery and the primary official residence of the Chancellor of the Federal Republic of Germany from 1949 until 1976. As the headquarters of the Federal Chancellery, it was simply known as the House of the Federal Chancellor. Since 2001, Palais Schaumburg has served as the secondary official seat of the German Federal Chancellery and the secondary official residence of the Chancellor of the Federal Republic of Germany.

History 
The late neoclassical palais was constructed between 1858 and 1860 for the cloth manufacturer Wilhelm Loeschigk. Bought by Prince Adolf of Schaumburg-Lippe, it was expanded during the following years. On January 31, 1939, the army bought the palace from Ernst Wolrad, Prince of Schaumburg-Lippe.

After World War II, the Belgian Army staff used the building until it became the official seat of the first chancellor of the Federal Republic, Konrad Adenauer, in November 1949. Two months later, he greeted the new republic’s first state guest, Robert Schuman.

Hans Schwippert rebuilt the building for the use as a Federal Chancellery in 1950. It was also extended by the so-called houses 2 and 3. By 1976, more space was needed, so a new building was planned. Some departments remained in the palais, which remained in use for ceremonial purposes. In 1963, the Wohn- und Empfangsgebäude des Bundeskanzlers, the so-called Chancellor bungalow (Kanzlerbungalow), in the modern style of architect Sep Ruf was built in the spacious park as a semi-official residence for the Chancellors.

Palais Schaumburg became home to the federal ministry for environment, conservation as well as reactor safety (Bundesministeriums für Umwelt, Naturschutz und Reaktorsicherheit) when it was formed in 1986. After the reunification of Germany in 1990, five "Federal Ministers for Special Affairs" kept offices in the palais.

The palais was used at the signing of the treaty about the creation of a currency, economy and social union in 1990 by representatives of both German states.

Palais Schaumburg has served from 2001 as the secondary official seat of the Federal Chancellery and the secondary official residence for the Chancellor, in which different departments are accommodated.

The palais is not publicly accessible. Usually, the Haus der Geschichte provides the opportunity to book tours and to visit the historical place. But since August 2013, the palais has been closed because of building restoration, estimated for five years. Instead of that, the Haus der Geschichte offers an Online-Panorama-Tour. The virtual tour shows all exhibition rooms as well as three views from the outside, providing a look at the building and the park.

Park 
A tree has been planted for every former Federal Chancellor of the Federal Republic in the Park Schaumburg, in memory of their periods of office:

References

External links

 Online-Panorama of the Palais Schaumburg on the official website of the Stiftung Haus der Geschichte der Bundesrepublik Deutschland

Buildings and structures in Bonn
Official residences in Germany
Palaces in North Rhine-Westphalia
Neoclassical architecture in Germany
Presidential residences